Stefan Georgiev may refer to:

 Stefan Georgiev (skier) (born 1977), Bulgarian alpine skier
 Stefan Georgiev (weightlifter) (born 1975), Bulgarian weightlifter
 Stefan Georgiev (swimmer) (born 1955), Bulgarian swimmer